Fernando Becerril (1944/1945 – 7 February 2023) was a Mexican actor. He was cast in numerous Spanish-language films since 1998.

Filmography
Becerril played in the following theatrical and television films:

Film

Television

References

External links
 

1940s births
2023 deaths
Male actors from San Luis Potosí
People from San Luis Potosí City
20th-century Mexican male actors
21st-century Mexican male actors
Year of birth missing (living people)